The Mortuary Temple of Amenhotep III, also known as Kom el-Hettân, was built by the main architect Amenhotep, son of Hapu, for Pharaoh Amenhotep III during the 18th Dynasty of the New Kingdom. The mortuary temple is located on the Western bank of the Nile river, across from the eastern bank city of Luxor. During its time, the Mortuary Temple of Amenhotep III was the largest funerary complex in Thebes that was built.
Only parts of the mortuary temple's layout remain, as well as the Colossi of Memnon, which are two large stone statues placed at the entrance measuring 18 meters (59 feet) high. Because the mortuary temple was built relatively close to the river, the annual flooding caused the site to decay at a more rapid rate. New research indicates that a large majority of the destruction on the mortuary temple can be attributed to the effects of an earthquake. It was long speculated that the earthquake occurred around 27 BC; however, investigations into the mortuary temple and surrounding colossi have debunked this time frame and instead have demonstrated it occurred around 1200 BC. Additional earthquakes after the one in 1200 BC have not been ruled out. The Colossi of Memnon and Amenhotep III Temple Project have helped conserve the site as well as possible.

Excavation history

Dr. Hourig Sourouzian was the main excavator in the early 2000s and the site was visited by Dr. Zahi Hawass, although the mortuary temple was previously excavated in the late 1900s as well. Laurent Bavay examined the pottery found at the site from the 1999-2002 excavation seasons. The Hypostyle Hall was cleared by Myriam Seco Álvarez. The mortuary temple has undergone several excavations since the early 2000s which have garnered new information including the north wall, undecorated granite pieces, Kushites as bound captives, lists of Nubian towns surrounding the Nile, and red granite colossal statues. Recent geoarchaeological research has shown that the main axis of the temple was constructed on a natural, elongated mound that stood well above the floodplain level of the New Kingdom period. As a result the Temple area at the west end stood high and dry most of the time and would have been subject to flooding only during  very rare high flood events.  Another important discovery by the same project has been a previously unknown branch of the Nile on the west side of the Nile Valley. It ran approximately south-north with the Colossi of Memnon placed on the west bank of the river, giving a dramatic riverside entrance to the Temple complex. This branch then ran north past the Ramasseum and other mortuary temples before swinging back east to rejoin the main channel of the Nile somewhere opposite Karnak Temple. This same branch was probably used in the various processional ceremonies that linked the east and west bank temples. It was probably also used to deliver building materials, including the Colossal statues, to the site.

Layout

The temple faced to the east, which is most likely due to the sun rising in the east, since Amenhotep III revered the sun god Amun. At the front of the mortuary temple, the Colossi of Memnon can be found, and as one enters, the long Hypostyle Hall leads to the Peristyle Sun Court, and the whole area is surrounded by three pylons, also known as gates. The Sun Court is divided into the north and south halves and consisted of statues of both Amenhotep III and the gods. The north side had brown quartzite statues from Lower Egypt, while the south side had red granite statues from Aswan in Upper Egypt.

Purpose 
The mortuary temple's primary purpose was as a place for offerings for Amenhotep III for after his passing and movement into the afterlife. The whole temple also symbolizes a mound and the "emergence of the world from the primeval waters of creation" every time the Nile river flooded the temple, since the Egyptians believed that the Earth was formed by a mound emerging from the water. Therefore, it is believed that the temple was intentionally built on a flood plain so this ideology could come true. Amenhotep III wanted to be revered as a god on Earth, not just in the afterlife. He built this enormous mortuary temple to leave a legacy that he was a living god who ruled on Earth. Examining the remains within temple, the temple indicates the unification of Egypt and the Sed Festival of Amenhotep III. The statues found within the temple were used during rituals commonly found within the Sed Festival; however, relief fragments show that the temple was not yet standing during Amenhotep III's first Sed Festival. A time frame for when a celebration at a later date may have occurred within the temple is II peret 29 or III peret 1. These celebrations took place in a courtyard within the temple during the last ten years of Amenhotep III. reign. The importance of the Sed Festival is that it portrays a reenactment of the unification of Egypt. To further reinforce the idea of unification, building materials from both Upper and Lower Egypt was used, which demonstrates Amenhotep III maintained sema-tawy (unification) of both lands. Additionally, Amenhotep III established the idea of Maat (justice and peace) over Islet (chaos) by having the statues of fauna, and therefore having control over them, as well as depicting bounded Egyptian enemies (such as the Nubian, Asiatics, Mesopotamians, Aegeans and Hittites) next to statues of himself.

Major findings

Statues 

There are hundreds to possibly thousands of statues within the temple. A large number of statues are unique to the temple and the rarity and form of the statues was also specific to this temple. The majority of the statues were for Gods such as the Sekhmet (lion-headed goddess), animals (such as lion-crocodile sphinx, jackals, scarabs beetles, and a white hippopotamus), other Egyptian gods, and Amenhotep III as a god. The purpose of the statues correlate with the larger purpose of the mortuary temple: the sed festival. Within the festival, there are many rituals that make up Amenhotep’s III first Sed. The Sekhmet statues served an important purpose in the ritual festivals. Looking at the statues, some Sekhmet statues are standing, some are sitting, while some are holding a papyrus scepter on left hand, and the symbol of life on the right hand. Jean Yoyotte, a French Egyptologist, comments that the goddess of Sekhmet served an important role as the “mistress of drunkenness” who provides healing qualities, which are meant to cure any illnesses of Amenhotep III. Also, she played an important role in the royal jubilee in order to "protect the sun-king against the enemies of the sun." Two specific rituals in which the other animal statues were used are the solar ritual and the creation of the sky map. The creation of the sky map in the mortuary temple was seen throughout the 18th dynasty, especially Thutmose III, to honor the deities of the heavens. Sekhmet statues were used in the process of creating the sky map in addition to the lion-crocodile sphinx, statues of a Hippo, and bull statue. The lion-crocodile sphinx is the third dimensional representation found. Looking at the white Hippopotamus, it is thought to have served a role in the white Hippopotamus ritual which had been seen under Thutmose III. For the specific solar festival, statues of Asbet, Maat, Hu, Horus, Isis for times of the day were seen. Outside of the Sed-Festival statuary, recent excavations around the pylons have found several colossi scattered throughout the temple. The most notable preserved colossi are the Colossi of Memnon, located at the first pylon. Fragments of a quartzite colossus, such as the chest, fallen torso, and knee, were found behind the Colossi of Memnon. Near the second pylon, another colossus of Amenhotep III made of monolithic quartzite was found. Examinations of the plinths of the colossi revealed imagery of the unification of Egypt and foreign lands that were under Egypt's rule.

Pottery 
Some of the pottery was examined by Laurent Bavay, a Belgium Egyptologist, who found ring-based cups, beer jars, and wine amphorae. These pieces were found in the Peristyle Sun Court and Third Pylon. Pottery found within the mortuary temple can be dated back to both the New Kingdom as well as the Late Roman Period. Moreover, pottery shards that were found on the eroded northern wall of temple provided evidence for the occurrence of earthquakes.

Stelae 
The two most prominent stelae within the mortuary temple are the Northern and the Southern Stelae. The northern, found in the Peristyle Court where it stands in full form, underwent several conservation efforts in 2010-2012. Similarly, the Southern Stelae was raised in the middle of the 20th century and mentions Amenhotep III describing the temple as “magnified”.

The temple's future
Dr. Zahi Hawass, Mansour Boraik, Ali el-Asfar and Ibrahim Soliman want to bring back the artifacts and findings from the Mortuary Temple of Amenhotep III to the original site, since they are dispersed in different museums. Many new statutes and colossi continue to be excavated, but there are many more statutes and artifacts damaged by the earthquake that are waiting be erected and displayed. Those working on conserving the temple hope to form an open-air museum and to eventually bring awareness of the importance of on-site conservation; however, due to a lack of funding no current progress has been made.

See also
Colossal quartzite statue of Amenhotep III found at the Mortuary Temple
Medinet Habu (Mortuary Temple of Ramesses III)

References

External links

Hourig Sourouzian, "Beyond Memnon: Buried for more than 3,300 years, remnants of Amenhotep III's extraordinary mortuary temple at Kom el-Hettan rise from beneath the earth," ICON Magazine, Summer 2004, p.10-17.

Buildings and structures completed in the 14th century BC
Amenhotep III
Theban Necropolis

sv:Kom el-Hetan